Parbati Kumar Goswami (born 1 January 1913-1992) was an Indian Jurist, acting Governor of Assam and Nagaland and former Judge of the Supreme Court of India. He was the first Assamese Justice in Supreme Court of India.

Early life
Goswami was born in 1913 in Assam, British India. His father was Bamdeb Goswami and mother's name Jogada Devi. He studied in English School at Sivasagar, passed B.A.(Hons.) from Cotton University with First Class and Gunabhiram Barooah Silver Medal and completed  B.L from Earle Law College of Gauhati.

Career
Goswami at first started practise at Dibrugarh in 1938 then came to the Calcutta High Court in 1943. He served as Government pleader since 1947-49. He was designated as Senior Advocate of the Supreme Court in 1953. He was the member of the State Law Commission. In 1967 Goswami was appointed as the Judge of Assam Nagaland High Court and thereafter became the Chief Justice of the same Court. From December 1970 to January 1971 he took over the charge of the Governor of Assam and Nagaland. He was also an active member of World Association of Judges in Geneva. On 10 October 1973 Justice Goswami was elevated in the post of Justice of Supreme court of India and retired on 31 December 1977.

References

1913 births
Governors of Assam
Governors of Nagaland
Indian judges
Chief Justices of the Gauhati High Court
Justices of the Supreme Court of India
20th-century Indian judges
21st-century Indian judges
Senior Advocates in India
People from Assam
Cotton College, Guwahati alumni
Year of death missing